Raspberry Magic is an American independent drama film about a young girl, Monica Shah, and her belief that she can save her parents' marriage by winning the science fair. Her science project uses touch therapy to grow raspberries in a forest.  She explores whether it is nature or nurture that can make them grow.  Directed by Leena Pendharkar, produced by Megha Kadakia, the movie premiered at the Cinequest Film Festival and the San Francisco International Asian American Film Festival in 2010.

Cast
 Lily Javaherpour as Monica Shah
 Bella Thorne as Sarah Patterson
 Meera Simhan as Nandini Shah
 Ravi Kapoor as Manoj Shah
 James Morrison as Henry Hooper
 Keya Shah as Gina Shah
 Alison Brie as Ms. Bradlee
 Maulik Pancholy as Amrish Patil
 Randall Batinkoff as Dylan
 Zach Mills as Zachary Dunlap
 Colter Allison as Cop

Reception
Raspberry Magic received generally positive reviews during its festival screenings.  Clinton Stark says that "Raspberry Magic delivers an inspired message about pursuing your dreams, recognizing and appreciating who you are, despite the day-to-day curve balls life might pitch at you," while the Raleigh, North Carolina News & Observer called it "a sweet little film that without adornment in style or storytelling evokes the nature of family drama and family love."

Awards
 Audience Award, Best Narrative Feature, Philadelphia Asian American Film Festival

References

External links
 
 
 

2010 films
2010 comedy-drama films
Films about Indian Americans
2010s English-language films
Comedy-drama films about Asian Americans
2010s American films